Jay Baron Nicorvo (born August 21, 1976) is an American novelist, poet, and essayist.

Life
Nicorvo was born in Perth Amboy, NJ and was raised in Sarasota, FL. He's married to the writer Thisbe Nissen and they live on an old farm outside Battle Creek, MI.

Career
Nicorvo's writing has appeared in Poets & Writers, The Baffler, Ploughshares, and  Salon (website). His poetry has been featured on PBS NewsHour.

Nicorvo's first novel, The Standard Grand, was published in 2017 by St. Martin’s Press.  It is about a group of veterans, traumatized by their wartime experiences, who meet in a crumbling resort in the Catskill Mountains.

Books
Deadbeat: Poems. Four Way Books (2012) . Deadbeat debuted on the Poetry Foundation bestseller list.
The Standard Grand: A Novel. St. Martin's Press (2017) .The Standard Grand was picked for IndieBound's Indie Next List, Library Journal's Debut Novels Great First Acts, Poets & Writers's "New and Noteworthy," and was named a best book of the year by The Brooklyn Rail.

References

External links
 Nicorvo's website
 The Rumpus interview
 NPR WMUK radio interview

20th-century American writers
21st-century American writers
Writers from Florida
Eckerd College alumni
Emerson College alumni
Living people
1976 births